Since 1 January 2020, the Cantal department of France has counted nine public establishments for intercommunal cooperation (EPCI) with their administrative seats in the department, one agglomerated community and 8 communauté de communes. One additional commune, Montgreleix, is part of the communauté de communes du Massif du Sancy whose administrative seat is located in the Puy-de-Dôme department.

History 
The  of the Cantal department met to examine the draft departmental plan for inter-municipal cooperation. On 7 March 2017, the CDCI approved, after examination of amendments, a plan that provided for six intercommunalities for the entirety of the Cantal department from 1 January 2017. This plan was stopped by the Prefect of Cantal on 30 March 2016.

Resistance from numerous communauté de communes to the project to fuse intercommunalities led to abandonmont of part of the legislative project. Finally, on 1 January 2017, the intercommunalities of the Cantal department numbered a total of nine moving forward.

On 1 January 2019, four communes left the Hautes Terres Communauté to join the communauté de communes du Pays Gentiane.

List of intercommunalities

References 

 
Cantal